The Center for the Great Islamic Encyclopedia (Center for Iranian and Islamic Studies) (CGIE) is a major iranian research institute with the task of researching and publishing general and topical encyclopedias about Iranian and Islamic culture.  Within the Islamic and Iranian research landscape, it is one of the leading and most prestigious institutions in the country, attracting scholars from all over the region. The centre has one of the largest libraries on Iranian and Islamic culture. The building was nominated for the Aga Khan Award for Architecture in 2001.

History 
The institute was founded in 1983 by Kazem Mousavi-Bojnourdi and is located in Darabad, Tehran. Mousavi-Bojnourdi explained his motivation for founding a scientific centre on these research topics as follows:„ The field of human civilization and culture is so vast that many of its angles have still remained undiscovered. The growth of science and knowledge in the Islamic world and other communities has created the need to gather collections containing information regarding  the current knowledge as well as the definitions and jargon used in that particular field of knowledge. This need has moved some scholars to author various series of books in those fields“The centre is directed by the High Council, which is composed of renowned scientists and theological scholars. Currently, the Council has four female and 50 male members. Council members are selected and appointed on the basis of their academic studies and research interests.

Research 
The research areas of the departments include comparative literature, Arabic and Iranian literature, history of political ideas, Islamic law and philosophy, history of Islam, oriental studies, History of the ancient Iranian and other fields of research.  

The Centre publishes a number of scholarly books, including the Encyclopaedia Islamica, published by Brill in English. The encyclopedia has received international attention due to its scientifically profound results for the knowledge of the cultural and theological development of Iranian and Islamic culture. Brill's Encyclopedia Islamica, which is edited by Farhad Daftary and Wilferd Madelung, is currently at its fifth volume. It is also published in Iran under the title Dā'erat-ol-Ma'āref-e Bozorg-e Eslāmi (Persian: دائرةالمعارف بزرگ اسلامی, "The Great Islamic Encyclopaedia") and is at the ninth letter of the Persian alphabet and its 22nd completed volume.

Notable Researchers 
Notable former and current scientists at The Center for the Great Islamic Encyclopedia are Dariush Shayegan, Azartash Azarnoush, Javad Tabatabai, Farhad Daftary, Wilferd Madelung, Ezzatollah Fooladvand, Katayun Mazdapour and Abbas Anvari.

Architecture 

The architecture of the building is not only intended to serve good research and teaching, but also to serve as a projection surface for its own and Islamic culture. The building combines traditional Iranian ornaments and construction methods with Islamic forms that are also found in important religious and spiritual sites. To accomplish this task a piece of property was selected in Darabad, Tehran.

References

See also 
Encyclopaedia Islamica
University of Tehran

Research institutes in Iran
Education in Tehran